Estevão António do Espírito Santo Mansidão (born 11 August 1940 in Alcochete) is a former Portuguese footballer who played as a midfielder.

External links 
 
 
 

1940 births
Living people
People from Alcochete
Portuguese footballers
Association football midfielders
Primeira Liga players
C.F. Os Belenenses players
S.C. Braga players
Portugal international footballers
Sportspeople from Setúbal District